Uranpyrochlore (of Hogarth 1977), also known as ellsworthite or betafite  is a rare earth mineral mostly found in the northern parts of North America. It is a uranpyrochlore and is named after Hardy V. Ellsworth of the Canadian Geological Survey by Walker and Parsons. It is a very uranium- and thorium- rich mineral, which in fact makes it slightly radioactive. Uranium makes up about 17.1% of the mineral. Ellsworthite is also known as the mineral Betafite. Ellsworthite is a thorium-bearing mineral that is found mostly in Canada and Alaska. It was first discovered in Hybla, Ontario, which is now a ghost town.

Composition

Ellsworthite has complex hydrous oxides of niobium, tantalum, sodium, calcium, with hydroxyl and fluorine; it may contain as much as 17% uranium.

Structure

The structure of ellsworthite is cubic and has a point group of 4/m 3* 2/m. It is part of the isometric system and has the space group Fd3m. It forms into a Hexoctahedral with {110}, {100}, {113}, {233}, and {230}.

Sources

Bulletin of the National Research Council, Number 77, Physics of the Earth - I Volcanology, By the Subsidiary Committee on Volcanology, Published by the National Research Council of The National Academy of Sciences Washington, D.C., (1931)

Oxide minerals
Uranium minerals
Niobium minerals
Tantalum minerals
Titanium minerals
Calcium minerals
Thorium minerals